The qualifying competitions for the 2015 CONCACAF U-20 Championship were handled by two regional of CONCACAF's bodies; the Caribbean Football Union (Caribbean zone) and the Central American Football Union (Central American zone).

Representative teams from Canada, Mexico and the United States automatically qualified for the final competition.

Caribbean zone

The Caribbean qualification competition (2014 CFU Men's U-20 Tournament) was organised by the Caribbean Football Union (CFU).

All match times are UTC−4.

Teams
A total of 20 teams entered the competition.

Notes

First round
The teams taking part in the first round were announced on 21 June 2014. The group winners and the two best runners-up advanced to the final round.

Group 1

Group 2

Group 3

Group 4

Group 5

Ranking of runners-up
On 22 June 2014, CFU published that the best ranked runner-up also qualifies for the Second round. On 26 June 2014, CONCACAF published that the best and second best ranked runner-up qualifier for the Second Round. Since Group 4 contains three teams, only the results against the first and third placed teams are counted.

Final round
The final round was hosted in Trinidad and Tobago.

On 22 June 2014, CFU announced that Jamaica would also receive a bye to the Second round, however four days later CONCACAF published that the second-best ranked runner-up would be taking part in the Second round.

The groups and resulting fixtures were changed at a later date. Antigua and Barbuda were removed and Saint Kitts and Nevis added (no explanation given). The top two from each group advanced to the 2015 CONCACAF U-20 Championship.

Group A

Group B

Third place playoff

Final

Awards
Golden Boot
 Kadeem Corbin
MVP
 Kadeem Corbin
Golden Glove
 Jean-Marc Antersijn
Fair Play Award

Source:

Central American zone

The Central American qualification competition was organised by the Central American Football Union (UNCAF). The competition was contested by the seven UNCAF teams in a round-robin tournament, hosted in El Salvador, where the top four teams qualified for the 2015 CONCACAF U-20 Championship.

By winning this tournament, Panama qualified for the 2015 Pan American Games men's football tournament.

All match times are UTC−6.

Qualified teams

North American zone
 (automatic)
 (automatic)
 (automatic)

Central American zone

Caribbean zone
 (hosts)

References

External links
Under 20s – Men, CONCACAF.com
Fútbol Masculino Sub-20, UNCAFut.com 
Men's U20, CFUfootball.org
First round results
Final round results

2015 CONCACAF U-20 Championship
U-20 Championship qualifying
CONCACAF U-20 Championship qualification